Rednex is a Swedish musical group whose style is a mix of American country music and modern Eurodance, with their appearance and stage names taking inspiration from the American redneck stereotypes. The band originally consisted of the lead singer Mary Joe (Annika Ljungberg), alongside Bobby Sue (Kent Olander), Ken Tacky (Arne Arstrand), Billy Ray (Jonas Nilsson) and Mup (Patrick Edenberg). Pat Reiniz (Patrick Edenberg) also served as the band's producer.  The band has gone through multiple lineup changes throughout its existence, with none of the members having an uninterrupted tenure. 

The group enjoyed success throughout the 1990s with novelty hits such as "Cotton Eye Joe", "Old Pop in an Oak", "The Spirit of the Hawk" and "Wish You Were Here", which often topped the charts in several European countries.

Band history

1994–1995: Formation and Sex & Violins
Rednex was initially the brainchild of Swedish producers Janne Ericsson, Örjan "Öban" Öberg, and Patrick Edenberg, who decided to try mixing American country and folk with modern dance and pop music. The name "Rednex" was chosen as a deliberate misspelling of the word "rednecks". The band originally consisted of the lead singer Mary Joe (Annika Ljungberg), alongside Bobby Sue (Kent Olander), Ken Tacky (Arne Arstrand), Billy Ray (Jonas Nilsson) and Mup (Patrick Edenberg). 

In 1994, Rednex reworked the traditional folk song "Cotton-Eyed Joe", retitled "Cotton Eye Joe", as a eurodance track, which became an international hit single. Edenberg was soon replaced by BB Stiff (Urban Landgren) after the "Cotton Eye Joe" release. The group's debut studio album titled Sex & Violins followed, spawning several more hit singles including "Old Pop in an Oak" and the ballad "Wish You Were Here". However, "Cotton Eye Joe" remains the group's only U.S. hit as of 2022 (#25 on the Billboard charts in March 1995). Two more tracks of the album, "Wild 'N Free" and "Rolling Home", have been released and became moderate hits. A promotional one-off single, the Nicole cover version "Ein Bisschen Frieden", has been released and labeled as "Collo Rossi" for the release.

1996–1997: Departure of Ljungberg and Riding Alone
In 1996 Rednex were featured on the charity single "Children", as part of the supergroup "Hand in Hand for Children". Later female lead singer Ljungberg was fired, partly due to disagreements with the other band members and went on to pursue a solo career. The rest of the band took a break from live performance and started working on new material. In 1997, the remaining four men released one more single, "Riding Alone", out of Sex & Violins, two years after the previous release "Rolling Home". Arstrand started a side project that same year called Explode, a progressive power metal band, and released the debut studio album Live Forever in Sweden.

1998–2000: Farm Out and controversial lineup changes
In autumn 1998, Whippy (Mia Löfgren) became the new female vocalist. They released their first single "The Way I Mate" in 1999. Soon after that release, Arstrand left the band, reducing the quintet to a quartet. The second studio album entitled Farm Out followed in 2000 and found some success in Europe, with the most successful single from the album, the second release "The Spirit of the Hawk", peaking #1 in the German Singles Chart. The album spawned a third and final single, the ballad "Hold Me for a While", which became a moderate success. In 2000, in the wake of Napster's rising presence in the music industry, co-founder Edenberg outlined a new strategy for Rednex. The group would become an entertainment group rather than just a band, so not to be solely dependent on record sales. As he presented this idea to the performers during the video shoot for "Hold Me For A While" in Kenya, he was met by great scepticism. Nilsson replied: "We will not become a goddamn circus act!". The aftermath of this conflict resulted in the whole band, all four members, Löfgren, Olander, Nilsson and Landgren, being replaced for the first time.

2001–2004: The Best of the West and more lineup changes
As of January 2001, the group now consisted of the female lead singer Scarlet (Julie-Anne Tulley, formerly known as Jules Tulley from Dreamhouse) from England, alongside the three male members Dagger (Anders Sandberg) from Sweden, Joe Cagg (Roy van der Haagen) and Jay Lee (Jean-Paul Engeln) from the Netherlands. It was the first time the band were not all Swedish. In 2001, the single "The Chase", the first single out of their 2002 first compilation album The Best of the West, has been released and charted in Germany and Switzerland. In 2002, the second and final single out of the album, a reworked 2002 remix of "Cotton Eye Joe", was released and made the Top 30 in Austria. In 2003, the two Dutchmen van der Haagen and Engeln were replaced by Ace Ratclaw (Tor Penten) from Sweden and Boneduster Crock (Björn Scheffler) from Germany. In October 2004, Tulley resigned from the group due to exhaustion.

2005–2006: Return of Ljungberg and Comeback

In 2006, original female vocalist Ljungberg returned as Tulley's replacement in the group, she was assigned exclusive rights to license the Rednex trademark until January 1, 2009. During this period the group's focus shifted towards Scandinavia. In January 2005, Ljungberg fired Scheffler, replacing him with her husband Snake (Jens Sylsjö). In 2006, Sandberg was also fired and replaced by Maverick (Anders Lundström). Four former members, Scheffler and Sandberg, alongside Tulley and van der Haagen, and later in April 2007 joined by Penten, also a former Rednex member, began to tour under the name "Rednex Tribute".

Focusing on live performance in Scandinavia, Rednex appeared at the 2005 IAAF World Championships in Athletics, in Helsinki. On March 11, 2006 Rednex entered the song "Mama, Take Me Home" in Semifinal 4 of the Swedish Melodifestivalen in Gothenburg. They qualified for the final via the Second Chance Round, finishing an overall sixth in the final. "Mama, Take Me Home" was subsequently released as the first single in a few European countries. The band's Scandinavian comeback continued as they released the second single "Fe Fi (The Old Man Died)" in November 2006, after having performed it at the Nickelodeon Kids' Choice Awards. The single was surprisingly successful, peaking #4 in the Swedish Single chart.

2009–2011: Second departure of Ljungberg and Singles
On January 1, 2009, after the end of Ljungberg's management licence, control of the Rednex brand returned to the band's founders. The remaining Rednex personnel Ljungberg, Lundström and Sylsjö were fired by the returning management following a dispute, and were replaced by members of the "Rednex Tribute" (Tulley, Sandberg, Penten and van der Haagen), all themselves former official Rednex. It was the second time the whole lineup had been replaced simultaneously. In January 2010, Rednex released a new single, "Devil's On The Loose", in a partnership with The Pirate Bay for free and legal download worldwide. A video for the track was recorded in August 2009 in Norrbyggeby, Sweden. The song was released as the first single from the planned album Saturday Night Beaver, which to date remains shelved due low single sales. Tulley soon also left Rednex for a second time, and was replaced by Dakotah (Nadja Flood), former singer in the Swedish dansband Nova, making her the fourth official female lead singer of Rednex.

2012–2014: Second departure of Tulley and Singles
In January 2012, Rednex announced that they had dissolved the concept of a permanent band, intending instead to use a larger pool of characters from which one female and three male performers would be chosen for each performance. Rednex claimed that this idea was "totally unproven and unheard of in the music industry". The pool of performers in 2012 included permanent members Flood, Sandberg, van der Haagen and Penten alongside possible replacements Scheffler, new male member Rufus Jones and new female vocalists Abby Hick and Misty Mae. At the time of the dissolution of the permanent Rednex lineup Tulley again left the band.

The second single "Racing" was released in May 2012. This was followed in November 2012 by "The End". The video for "The End" was recorded on September 2, 2012 at Garay Utca, the "ghetto of Budapest", and is a "flowumentary". Rednex refuted the notion that "The End" is related to 2012 doomsday theories. The band in these two videos now consisted of Flood, van der Haagen, Sandberg and Penten with Rufus Jones making a cameo appearance in "The End" video.

2015–2017: Return of Löfgren

In 2015, it was announced that second female singer Löfgren would replace Flood and rejoin the band. Also, Scheffler returned to the group. On New Year's Day, Rednex recorded a music video for "Innit for the Money". The single for "Innit for the Money" followed in 2016.

In February performers Cassidy, Rattler, and Pervis the Palergator joined the band. Cassidy left Rednex 3 months later.

Rednex made their debut on a North American stage in Carson City, Nevada, to honor fallen Deputy Carl Howell.

On New Year's Eve 2017, Rednex played for the fourth time at the Brandenburger Tor in Berlin, in front of an audience of more than one million.

2018–present: Manly Man, livestream and performer turbulence

In early 2018 the Rednex performer pool grew to include 17 people, the highest number so far. Added to the pool were Zoe, Moe Lester the Limp and Jiggie McClagganahan.

The single and video Manly Man was released in July 2018. The video was recorded in Jelcz-Laskowice, Poland. The main characters are Dagger and Misty Mae, though all 25 Rednex performers through history are featured at some point through video flashbacks.

During 2018, Rednex started a live streaming channel on Twitch. After a series of tests, the premiere happened on August 10 in connection to a show in Berlin. In the press release they claimed to be the first pop band, with a worldwide hit to their name, to live stream themselves 24/7 in connection to all their shows. During the same weekend, August 10-12th, Rednex performed with three different line-ups in three different territories, totaling 13 performers, which was a new record. Zoe, Moe Lester the Limp, Spades and Pervis the Palergator did shows in Romania and Hungary, while Billy Ray, Ace Ratclaw, Boneduster Crock, Misty Mae and Jiggie McClagganahan did shows in East Germany (Berlin & Schwerin), and Abby Hick, Rattler, Cash and Joe Cagg did shows in West Germany (Bonn & Frankfurt).

In September Abby Hick, Rattler, Boneduster Crock and Joe Cagg left Rednex. Whippy, Billy Ray and BB Stiff became reserves, reducing the pool to 10 performers. The band was still for sale for €2,000,000.

In November 2021, Jason Holler, former front man in the American rock band Kentucky Knife Fight, was revealed as the Original Boneduster Crock.

Artistry

Musical style
Rednex is a mix of modern dance, pop, eurodance sounds with classical country, folk and bluegrass elements. Their dance tracks also features eurodance sounds, which were very famous and popular in Europe, Oceania and South America at that time. Rednex are best known for their dance country songs "Cotton Eye Joe", "Old Pop in an Oak", "Way I Mate" or "Racing". The style of eurodance was dance music with a female singer for the refrain and a male rapper for the verses to follow a traditional verse-chorus structure. However Rednex reversed it, with the female singer singing the verses and the male vocalist singing the bridge and the refrain. Although there are also tracks from other genres featured, such as pop ballads like "Wish You Were Here", "Hold Me for a While", "Rolling Home" or "Anyway You Want Me" or classical country driven songs such as "Riding Alone", "Ranger Jack" or "Nowhere In Idaho" with less dance sounds. These tracks are not considered to be europop.

While their debut studio album "Sex & Violins" has the same amount on dance/country, classic country songs and ballads, their second album "Farm Out" is full of their dance/country style songs, except one ballad "Hold Me for a While" and one country song "Ranger Jack". Since 2006, Rednex returned with a more mature country pop sound such in "Mama, Take Me Home", "Fe Fi (The Old Man Died)" or "Football Is Our Religion". The lyrics are of tongue-in-cheek, innuendo and sexual topics.

Public image
Rednex usually perform as personas that parody the "redneck" stereotype. For events and promotions, but also for music videos and cover arts, the group is styled in the American redneck stereotypes. In live performances and interviews, the members usually appear in a rough, unrefined character. Each member has an individual redneck nickname (see "Members" area to see the nicknames). Since 2000, Rednex have functioned much like an entertainment troupe as like a band, with an ever-shifting lineup of performers representing the band. As of 2015, there have been 16 performers in the permanent band.

Members

Permanent members
1994: Bobby Sue (Kent Olander), Billy Ray (Jonas Nilsson), Ken Tacky (Anders Arstrand), Mup (Ranis Edenberg), Mary Joe (Annika Ljungberg)
1994–1995: Bobby Sue, Billy Ray, Ken Tacky, Mary Joe, BB Stiff (Urban Landgren)
1996–1997: Bobby Sue, Billy Ray, Ken Tacky, BB Stiff
1998–1999: Whippy (Mia Löfgren), Bobby Sue, Billy Ray, Ken Tacky, BB Stiff
2000: Whippy, Bobby Sue, Billy Ray, BB Stiff
2001–2003: Scarlet (Julie-Anne Tulley), Dagger (Anders Sandberg), Joe Cagg (Roy van der Haagen), Jay Lee (Jean-Paul Engeln)
2003–2004: Scarlet, Dagger, Ace Ratclaw (Tor Penten), Boneduster Crock (Björn Scheffler)
2004–2005: Dagger, Ace Ratclaw, Boneduster Crock, Annika Ljungberg
2005–2005: Dagger, Ace Ratclaw, Annika Ljungberg, Jens Sylsjö (Snake)
2006–2006: Anders Lundström (Maverick), Penten, Sylsjö, Ljungberg
2007–2008: Anders Lundström (Maverick), Sylsjö, Ljungberg
2009–2012: Scarlet, Dagger, Ace Ratclaw, Joe Cagg

Pool member changes
2012-13: Dakotah (Nadja Flood), Abby Hick, Dagger, Ace Ratclaw, Joe Cagg, Rufus Jones, Mup
2014: Misty Mae joins.
2015: Whippy (Mia Löfgren), Boneduster Crock, Spades, Billy Ray, BB Stiff join. Dakotah leaves.
2017: Pervis the Palergator, Cash, Rattler and Cassidy join. Cassidy leaves. Dagger becomes reserve.
2018: Zoe, Jiggie McClagganahan, Moe Lester the Limp join. Whippy, Abby Hick, Boneduster Crock, Joe Cagg, Rattler leave. Billy Ray, BB Stiff become reserves.

Other members
Göran Danielsson (Original studio singer of Ken Tacky's vocals); died 2021

Timeline

Other brand ventures

Spin offs and franchises
In January 2012, Rednex announced that they had dissolved the concept of a permanent band, intending instead to use a larger pool of characters from which one female and three male performers would be chosen for each performance. Rednex claimed that this idea was "totally unproven and unheard of in the music industry". In November 2012, Rednex began a franchise operation in Australia & New Zealand. Four new performers from Auckland and Wellington were recruited to form a second Rednex with a non exclusive license to perform in Australasia. Performers in the NZ/Australian lineup include: Rayanna Randy Payne (Theresa Murphy), Rawtooth Rick (Anthony Sibbald) and Slimboy (Pascal Roggen). A press release accompanying the franchise launch stated: "it's the first time an internationally known pop band has cloned itself".

2003: Rednex Revival Band (Ljungbergs band in 2003, when she wasn't allowed to perform under the Rednex trademark before she rejoined Rednex)
2005: Rednex Tribute (Tulley, Sandberg, van der Haagen, Penten, Scheffler, all former Rednex members, when they weren't allowed to perform under the Rednex trademark)
2009: Cotton Eye Joe Show (Band name, when the Rednex lineup Ljungberg, Lundström and Sylsjö lost the rights to perform under the Rednex trademark)
2012: Rednex NZ (An entire separate created Rednex group to perform in Australia and New Zealand consisting of Murphy, Sibbald and Roggen)

Use in media
"Cotton Eye Joe" is featured in the films The Negotiator, Space Truckers, Hood of Horror, Studentfesten, Les 11 Commandements, C'est la vie! (2017 film) and Milk Punch, in the TV series Malcolm in the Middle, My Name Is Earl, Peep Show, New Girl (s02e25), The Morgana Show, Lukas, Beavis and Butt-head, The Ranch (TV series) and a Season 13 episode of Family Guy, and in TV commercials by Telia and Telefonica. "Hittin' The Hay" and "Wild 'N Free" are featured in the film Barnyard. "Ride The Hurricane's Eye" was title track for German TV-series WinneToons. "Spirit of the Hawk" was title track for the German version of Fort Boyard in 2000.

Games
The Inbred With Rednex extended play features the interactive multimedia part "Inbred With Rednex" as the first track of the disc, which is a point 'n' click adventure game starring Rednex, playable only for Windows & Mac. The whole release is housed in an 18x23cm game box. "Cotton Eye Joe" has been featured in the video games Dancing Stage EuroMIX 2, Just Dance 3 by Nintendo Wii and Carnival Games. PlayStation's SingStar features the songs "Cotton Eye Joe" and "Old Pop in an Oak".

In popular culture
"Cotton Eye Joe" has been performed numerous times in various talent shows including American Idol. One of the more regionally famous performances being by Király L. Norbi in the Hungarian X-Faktor.
"Cotton Eye Joe" is frequently played at sports venues including the gold medal game in ice hockey at the 2010 Winter Olympics and during the seventh-inning stretch at Yankee Stadium.
"Cotton Eye Joe" was used throughout the film Swiss Army Man, frequently sung by the main characters.
 The music video for "Cotton Eye Joe" was featured in an episode of Beavis and Butt-head. The two make fun of it during the music video segment of the show.
 "Cotton Eye Joe" is frequently played for a segment called "Coin Quest" in the Adult Swim television series FishCenter Live.

Discography

 Sex & Violins (1995)
 Farm Out (2000)
 The Best of the West (2002)

References

External links

 Rednex official website
 Rednex discography at Discogs

Swedish Eurodance groups
Swedish pop music groups
Swedish country music groups
Jive Records artists
Zomba Group of Companies artists
Musical groups established in 1994
House musicians
Swedish electronic musicians
English-language singers from Sweden
Melodifestivalen contestants of 2002